This is a list of colonial governors of Suriname, a country in northern South America. It borders French Guiana to the east, Guyana to the west, Brazil to the south, and the Atlantic Ocean to the north. Suriname was first colonized by the British, and captured by the Dutch in 1667, who governed it as Surinam until 1954. The country of Suriname achieved independence from the Kingdom of the Netherlands on 25 November 1975.

List of governors
Italics indicate de facto continuation of office

See also 
 Politics of Suriname
 President of Suriname
 First Lady of Suriname
 Vice President of Suriname
 List of prime ministers of Suriname
 List of deputy prime ministers of Suriname

External links
 
 World Statesmen - Suriname

 
Colonial governors
Suriname
Colonial governors